The canton of Noirétable is a French former administrative division located in the department of Loire and the Rhone-Alpes region. It was disbanded following the French canton reorganisation which came into effect in March 2015. It consisted of 12 communes, which joined the canton of Boën-sur-Lignon in 2015. It had 4,021 inhabitants (2012).

The canton comprised the following communes:

Cervières
La Chamba
La Chambonie 
La Côte-en-Couzan
Noirétable
Saint-Didier-sur-Rochefort
Saint-Jean-la-Vêtre
Saint-Julien-la-Vêtre
Saint-Priest-la-Vêtre
Saint-Thurin
Les Salles
La Valla-sur-Rochefort

See also
Cantons of the Loire department

References

Former cantons of Loire (department)
2015 disestablishments in France
States and territories disestablished in 2015